Suvorovo is a town in northeastern Bulgaria.

Suvorovo may also refer to the following places:

 Suvorovo Municipality, Bulgaria
 Suvorovo Microdistrict, Moskovsky District, Kaliningrad, Russia
 Suvorovo, Belgorod Oblast, Russia
 Suvorovo, Gryazovetsky District, Vologda Oblast, Russia
 Suvorovo, Babayevsky District, Vologda Oblast, Russia
 Berezanka, Ukraine, known as Suvorovo 1914–1923
 Ștefan Vodă, Moldova, known as Suvorovo during the Soviet period until 1990

See also

 Suvorovo culture, or the Suvorovo group, a Copper Age culture 4500 BC – 4100 BC.